Bruce Anthony Buffer (born May 21, 1957) is an American professional mixed martial arts ring announcer and the official octagon announcer for Ultimate Fighting Championship (UFC) events, introduced on broadcasts as the "Veteran Voice of the Octagon". Buffer's catchphrase is "It's time!", which he announces before the main event of the UFC. He is the half brother of boxing and professional wrestling ring announcer Michael Buffer, and is the President and CEO of their company, The Buffer Partnership. Buffer holds a black belt in Tang Soo Do and has fought as a kickboxer.

Early life and martial arts background
Buffer first ventured into martial arts when he was thirteen years old and living in Philadelphia, Pennsylvania, studying judo and achieving the rank of green belt. He moved to Malibu, California with his family at the age of fifteen and befriended two of the students of Chuck Norris, who introduced him to Tang Soo Do, in which he holds a second degree black belt. He began kickboxing in his twenties but was forced to give the sport up at 32 after suffering his second concussion.

UFC announcing
In 1996, Buffer announced the preliminary fight on UFC 8, and later hosted all fights at UFC 10. In 1997 he appeared as himself on the Season 3 Episode 24 of the Friends sitcom, "The One with the Ultimate Fighting Champion". At the stage he convinced UFC owner Robert Myer to hire him as the full-time ring announcer, starting with UFC 13.

Buffer uses catch phrases in his UFC announcing, and also has a signature move called the "Buffer 180", in which he motions directly across the Octagon before quickly spinning 180° and pointing to the corner being introduced. Buffer performs 45° and 90° turns before most "Buffer 180s", but reserves the "Buffer 180" for main events and co-main events. At UFC 100, after months of encouragement from Joe Rogan, Buffer performed a "Buffer 360" during his introduction of Frank Mir vs. Brock Lesnar. He also performed the "Buffer Bow" exclusively for Randy Couture and Anderson Silva, bending down as a knight would to a king in the accolade.

Notable appearances outside UFC
Buffer has announced many other MMA promotions internationally including K-1 events and also the 2008 Joel Casamayor vs. Michael Katsidis boxing event on HBO. He also announces for the biannual ADCC (Abu Dhabi Combat Club) submission wrestling tournament.

Buffer is a world-rated poker player on the professional circuit.  He has appeared on ESPN's World Series of Poker Main Event show playing World Champion Chris Moneymaker at the televised table in 2007 and in 2005 made the Final Table of the World Poker Tour in the Season 3 Invitational at the Commerce Casino, where he placed 6th.  He appeared on an MMA versus poker pro match during the sixth season of the NBC show Poker After Dark along with Strikeforce Fighter Dan Henderson and UFC Fighter Randy Couture. Buffer outlasted them as well as pros Erick Lindgren and Patrik Antonius to finish second, losing in heads-up play to Howard Lederer.  At the World Series of Poker 2010 main event final table he was given the honor of starting the final table with the poker phrase "Shuffle up and deal!"  As of September 2010, the Luxor Las Vegas has named their poker room after Bruce Buffer.

In 2007 he appeared on the HBO comedy-drama series Entourage, in the episode entitled "Gotcha!", announcing an exhibition fight for Chuck Liddell's charity. On March 20, 2012, he was featured on the Comedy Central show Tosh.0. Buffer appeared as himself in the 2015 film Hot Tub Time Machine 2. 
He also appeared as one of the fight fans alongside his brother Michael in the 2018 mystery comedy movie Holmes & Watson.

He is also the official announcer for the World Series of Beer Pong.

He was featured as an announcer pack in the multiplayer online battle arena game Smite and class-based first person shooter game Paladins both published by Hi-Rez Studios. He is also an unlockable player character in the fighting game EA Sports UFC 3.

He provided announcing on the UFC-inspired song "It's Time" by American & Dutch DJs Steve Aoki and Laidback Luke.

In October 2019 the gaming developer Relax Gaming released a new video slot machine with Buffer called "It's Time". The slot was developed with Buffer and the same company had earlier made a slot-game with Michael Buffer, Bruce's older brother.

In the 13th episode of Hell's Kitchen season 19, Buffer made an appearance during the episode's challenge.

Buffer is the official announcer for the PlayStation 5 exclusive videogame Destruction AllStars, which was developed by Lucid Games and released in February 2021.

On September 13, 2021, Buffer announced for ESPN's Monday Night Football matchup, where the Las Vegas Raiders hosted the Baltimore Ravens at Allegiant Stadium.

In July 2022, Buffer appeared in the stand-up comedy special "Infamous" as he  introduced comedian Andrew Schulz.

In fall of 2022, Buffer appeared in ads for Canadian mortgage brokerage Dominion Lending Centres.

Personal life
In 1989, Bruce was introduced to his half-brother, Michael Buffer, when their birth father contacted Michael after seeing him on television. In the mid-1990s, Bruce became Michael's agent/manager. The pair have since worked together to form a company and grow their business via licensing and appearances. The name of the company is The Buffer Partnership.

References

External links

Bruce Buffer's love for poker (Interview: video + transcript)

Living people
Mixed martial arts announcers
American male kickboxers
American tang soo do practitioners
Public address announcers
1957 births